Steven Lorentz (born April 13, 1996) is a Canadian professional ice hockey centre for the San Jose Sharks of the National Hockey League (NHL). The Carolina Hurricanes selected him in the seventh round, 186th overall, at the 2015 NHL Entry Draft.

Early life
Lorentz was born on April 13, 1996, in Kitchener, Ontario. He was the only son of Mark and Karon Lorentz, and was raised with his three sisters in nearby Waterloo, Ontario. He began ice skating at the age of two, and was playing organized minor ice hockey three years later. Although players his age were usually divided randomly among the four local teams, the coaches held a "draft lottery" for the skilled Lorentz.

Playing career

Junior
After leading the Waterloo Wolves AAA club in scoring, Lorentz was chosen by the Peterborough Petes in the 12th round, 226th overall, in the 2012 Ontario Hockey League Priority Selection.

Professional

Carolina Hurricanes
On June 27, 2015, the Carolina Hurricanes selected Lorentz in the seventh round, 186th overall in the 2015 NHL Entry Draft.

Following his fourth completed junior OHL season with the Peterborough Petes, the Hurricanes signed Lorentz on a three-year, entry-level contract on April 21, 2017.

Lorentz was one of those 31 players for the Hurricanes invited to the "bubble" as part of the 2020 Stanley Cup playoffs, but he did not play.

On October 15, 2020, the Hurricanes signed Lorentz to a two-year, two-way contract. In the pandemic delayed 2020–21 season, Lorentz made his NHL debut on January 28, 2021, in a game against the Tampa Bay Lightning. He subsequently recorded his first point on January 30 with an assist against the Dallas Stars. Lorentz scored his first career NHL goal on March 2, 2021, in a game against the Nashville Predators.

San Jose Sharks
On July 13, 2022, the Hurricanes traded Lorentz, goaltender Eetu Makiniemi and a conditional third-round selection in the 2023 NHL Entry Draft to the San Jose Sharks in exchange for Brent Burns and Lane Pederson. On July 22, the Sharks signed Lorentz to a two-year contract extension.

Playing style
Carolina Hurricanes Director of Amateur Scouting Tony MacDonald said of Lorentz in 2015, "He's a good two-way player who plays well with and without the puck."

Personal life
Lorentz is the grandson of Jim Lorentz, a former NHL player and broadcaster.

Career statistics

References

External links

1996 births
Living people
Canadian ice hockey centres
Carolina Hurricanes draft picks
Carolina Hurricanes players
Charlotte Checkers (2010–) players
Florida Everblades players
Peterborough Petes (ice hockey) players
Ice hockey people from Ontario
Sportspeople from Kitchener, Ontario
San Jose Sharks players